Birkenhead Dock railway station was situated in Birkenhead, Wirral, England. The station opened as the eastern terminus of the Hoylake Railway in 1866. With the opening of the horse drawn Woodside and Birkenhead Dock Street Tramway in 1873, the station probably became the world's first tram to train interchange station. The station was closed to passengers in 1888 being superseded by Birkenhead Docks railway station which was later named Birkenhead North. The former passenger station was renamed Birkenhead Dock Goods, with the platforms still in existence in 1937, with the goods station closing the following year. The site was used as railway sidings until the 1990s.

References

Sources
 

Disused railway stations in the Metropolitan Borough of Wirral
Former Wirral Railway stations
Railway stations in Great Britain opened in 1866
Railway stations in Great Britain closed in 1888